The Seneschal of the Agenais was an officer carrying out and managing the domestic affairs of the lord of the former county and district of Agenais.  During the course of the twelfth century, the seneschalship, also became an office of military command.

The seneschal managed the household, coordinating between the receivers of various landholdings and the chamber, treasury, and the chancellory or chapel.  The seneschals of the Agenais, like those appointed in Périgord, Poitou, and Najou had custody of demesne fortresses, the regional treasuries, and presidency of the highest court of regional custom.

List of Seneschals
Jean I de Grailly (1282)
Ramon Durand (1304–1305)
Arnould de Caupenne (1307)
Pierre de Mermande (1317)
Robert de Houdetot (1346)
Richard Walkfare (1366)
Nopar, Lord of Caumont (1399)

Citations

References

13th century in France
14th century in France
Historical legal occupations
Legal history of France